Thomas Howarth (10 May 1845 – 12 October 1897) was an English cricketer who played for Derbyshire in 1873.

Howarth was born in Glossop, Derbyshire and became a cotton weaver. He played for Derbyshire in the 1873 season in one first-class match against Lancashire in August, scoring seven runs in the two innings. He played for his Glossop club and in 1874 in a match against the United South of England Eleven was bowled out in turn by W. G. Grace and James Lillywhite.

Howarth died in Fylde, Lancashire at the age of 52.

References

1845 births
1897 deaths
People from Glossop
Cricketers from Derbyshire
English cricketers
Derbyshire cricketers